The Norfolk County Jail was a jail located on Village Avenue in Dedham, Massachusetts. It replaced the first Norfolk County Jail on nearby Highland Street.

Notable inmates
Notable inmates included Jason Fairbanks and Sacco and Vanzetti. Sacco's seven-year-old son, Dante, would sometimes stand on the sidewalk outside the jail and play catch with his father by throwing a ball over the wall.

Building
The two story stone building was built in 1817 and was 33' square. Part of the jail was torn down in 1851 to erect a central, octagonal portion and two wings. It resulted in a building with the shape of a Latin cross, and featured Gothic Revival windows. The three tiers of cells radiated out like spokes from the central guardroom. After it was built, the tools used were auctioned off at Marsh's Tavern.

Inmates were housed in the jail until 1992 when the Norfolk County Correctional Center was opened in 1992. A court forced the closure after 13 inmates escaped in 1989. There were at least 27 break outs during the prison's history.

Hangings
There were two hangings in the central rotunda. First was George C. Hersey on August 8, 1862. Over 300 people received tickets to watch. James H. Costley was hung on June 25, 1875. Again, 300 people watched as his body twitched and convulsed for close to two minutes. One spectator fainted, and others obtained pieces of the hangmans rope to bring home as souvenirs. It was the last execution in Norfolk County.

Condominiums
In 1999, the jail was converted by the Brookline-based Parencorps into a condominium complex known as Stoneleigh. The sale price was more than $1 million.

References

Works cited

1817 establishments in Massachusetts
Buildings and structures in Dedham, Massachusetts
History of Dedham, Massachusetts
Defunct prisons in Massachusetts
1992 disestablishments in Massachusetts